Claramunt is a surname. Notable people with the surname include:

Empar Claramunt (1954–2021), Spanish puppeteer
Enrique Claramunt (born 1948), Spanish footballer 
José Claramunt (born 1946), Spanish footballer 
Lluís Claramunt (1951–2000), Catalan artist
Teresa Claramunt (1862–1931), Catalan Spanish anarcho-syndicalist